Emerson Aparecido Vivas Vergílio, or simply Emerson (born May 28, 1982 in Divinópolis), is a Brazilian defensive midfielder.

Honours
Minas Gerais State League: 2005, 2006

Contract
Villa Nova (Loan) 1 January 2008 to 15 May 2008
Cruzeiro 1 January 2006 to 31 December 2008

External links
 CBF
 villanovamg
 villanovense

1982 births
Living people
Brazilian footballers
América Futebol Clube (MG) players
Cruzeiro Esporte Clube players
Ipatinga Futebol Clube players
Esporte Clube Bahia players
Villa Nova Atlético Clube players
América Futebol Clube (RN) players
Association football midfielders